Honey is the twenty-second studio album by American pop singer Andy Williams, released in the spring of 1968 by Columbia Records.  In reviewing the LP William Ruhlmann of Allmusic traced the progression of the Williams formula, noting that "he had been drawing on the recent hit parade for some of his material for years. But Honey marked his complete crossover to such an approach. Where earlier Williams albums had been a canny mix of movie songs, standards, pop hits, and foreign -- especially French -- material, ten of Honey'''s 11 tracks were songs that had been Top 40 hits in the last two years."

The album made its first appearance on Billboard's Top LPs chart in the issue dated June 8, 1968, and remained there for 40 weeks, peaking at number nine.  It entered the UK album chart shortly thereafter in July and reached number four over the course of 17 weeks, and the  Recording Industry Association of America awarded the album Gold certification on November 1 of that year.

The album was released on compact disc for the first time as one of two albums on one CD by Collectables Records on March 23, 1999, the other album being Williams's Columbia release from the spring of 1969, Happy Heart. This same pairing was also released as two albums on one CD by Sony Music Distribution in 2000. The Collectables CD was included in a box set entitled Classic Album Collection, Vol. 1, which contains 17 of his studio albums and three compilations and was released on June 26, 2001.

Reception
Ruhlmann gave the album a mixed review, writing, "The singer did his best and was rewarded with yet another Top Ten gold-record seller, but the album lacked the balance of earlier efforts."Billboard'' wrote that "Williams's relaxed and pleasant manner is admirably suited for the title song" and concluded that the album was "solid Williams fare."

Track listing

Side one
 "The Impossible Dream (The Quest)" from Man of La Mancha (Joe Darion, Mitch Leigh) – 2:39
 "This Is My Song" (Charles Chaplin) – 2:53
 "By the Time I Get to Phoenix" (Jimmy Webb) – 3:49
 "(Theme from) Valley of the Dolls" from Valley of the Dolls (André Previn, Dory Previn) – 3:40
 "Scarborough Fair/Canticle" (Art Garfunkel, Paul Simon) – 3:46
 "Love Is Blue (L'Amour Est Bleu)" (Brian Blackburn, Pierre Cour, André Popp) – 2:46

Side two
 "Honey (I Miss You)" (Bobby Russell) – 4:30
 "Windy" (Ruthann Friedman) – 2:25
 "Our Last Goodbye" (Nick DeCaro, William "Ju Ju" House) – 2:25
 "Spooky" (Buddy Buie, James B. Cobb, Jr., Harry Middlebrooks, Mike Shapiro) – 3:18
 "Up, Up and Away" (Jimmy Webb) – 2:36

Personnel
From the liner notes for the original album:

Andy Williams - vocals
Nick DeCaro - arranger, producer
Rafael O. Valentin - recording engineer
Bob Cato - photographer

References

Bibliography

1968 albums
Andy Williams albums
Columbia Records albums